Somebody Waiting is a 1971 American short documentary film produced by Woody Omens. It was nominated for an Academy Award for Best Documentary Short.

References

External links

1971 films
1971 short films
1970s short documentary films
American short documentary films
American independent films
Documentary films about children
Documentary films about health care
1970s English-language films
1970s American films
1971 independent films